Tin Tut, CBE (also spelt Tin Htut; 1 February 1895 – 18 September 1948) was the 1st Minister of Foreign Affairs of the Union of Burma, and the Minister of Finance in Aung San's pre-independence government.

Educated at Dulwich and Queens' College, Cambridge, Tin Tut was the first Burmese to become an Indian Civil Service officer. He was Prime Minister Aung San's deputy in the government. However, he was not present in the cabinet meeting on 19 July 1947. On that day, assassination that claimed the lives of Aung San and six other cabinet ministers occurred .

He was mortally wounded when a bomb exploded in his car on Sparks Street on 18 September 1948. He died shortly after in Rangoon General Hospital.

A close adviser of Aung San, he was instrumental in negotiations for Burma's independence including Panglong and Nu-Attlee agreements. Historian Thant Myint-U called him "the brightest Burmese officer of his generation".

References

Assassinated Burmese politicians
1948 deaths
Commanders of the Order of the British Empire
Finance ministers of Myanmar
Foreign ministers of Myanmar
Anti-Fascist People's Freedom League politicians
People murdered in Myanmar
1895 births
Members of the Central Legislative Assembly of India
People educated at Dulwich College
People from Yangon
Alumni of Queens' College, Cambridge
Indian Civil Service (British India) officers